The 1977 IBF World Championships were held in Malmö, Sweden in 1977.

Medalists

Medal table

Events

References

External links
 Straits Times
 Badminton.de: Men's singles draw

 
BWF World Championships
IBF World Championships
Badminton
Badminton
Badminton tournaments in Sweden
1970s in Malmö
IBF World Championships